Lansdowne is a suburb of the town of Katherine, Northern Territory, Australia. It is within the Katherine Town Council local government area. The area was officially defined as a suburb in April 2007, adopting the name from Anne Pascoe Lansdowne (1909 - 1973) and her husband Frank (1907 - 1989), both in whom co-owned Kumbidgee Station brahman stud.

References

2007 establishments in Australia
Suburbs of Katherine, Northern Territory